Muravlenko is a town in Yamalo-Nenets Autonomous Okrug, Russia, located  southeast of Salekhard. Population:

History
It was founded as the oil-extracting settlement of Muravlenkovsky in 1984. It was granted town status on August 6, 1990.

Administrative and municipal status
Within the framework of administrative divisions, it is incorporated as the town of okrug significance of Muravlenko—an administrative unit with the status equal to that of the districts. As a municipal division, the town of okrug significance of Muravlenko is incorporated as Muravlenko Urban Okrug.

Twin towns
 Claremore, Oklahoma, United States

References

Notes

Sources

External links
 Official website of Muravlenko
 Official website of Yamalo-Nenets Autonomous Okrug. Information about Muravlenko.

Cities and towns in Yamalo-Nenets Autonomous Okrug
Cities and towns built in the Soviet Union
Populated places established in 1984
Socialist planned cities